A lacewing is a winged insect in the order Neuroptera.

Lacewing may also refer to:

Lacewing, a variety of budgerigar, Melopsittacus undulatus, produced in aviculture by crossing Cinnamons with Inos
Neuropterida, an obsolete concept of the order Neuroptera including alderflies, dobsonflies, fishflies and snakeflies
Cethosia, a genus of butterflies

Animal common name disambiguation pages